Sēlpils Parish is an administrative territorial entity of Jēkabpils Municipality in the Selonia region of Latvia. Prior to 2009, it was an administrative unit of Jēkabpils District. The administrative center is the village of Sēlija.

Towns, villages and settlements of Sēlpils Parish 
 Arbidāni
 Bisenieki
 Bitānkalns
 Buivāni
 Ezerciems
 Gretes
 Īlenāni
 Ķipu kalns
 Kleberkalns
 Līkumi
 Naudīdzāni
 Pāvuli
 Plāteri
 Plītes
 Priekšāni
 Puļpāni
 Riesti
 Sēlija
 Sēlpils
 Spietiņi
 Ūdrāni
 Vecsēlpils
 Zaķēni

External links
 

Parishes of Latvia
Jēkabpils Municipality
Selonia